The  Oriental grosbeaks (Eophona) are a genus of finches containing two species: The genus was introduced in 1851 by the English ornithologist and bird artist John Gould. The name Eophona is derived from the classical Greek words ēōs meaning "dawn" and phōnē meaning "shout" or "cry".

References 

 
Bird genera